The Aladin Music Hall is a nightclub located in Bremen, Germany. The club has hosted many famous artists over the years, including Saxon, Golden Earring, Foghat, Uriah Heep, Nirvana and Blue Öyster Cult. The Aladin opened in 1977.

References

External links
 Official website

Nightclubs in Germany
Music venues in Germany